The 1984–85 NC State Wolfpack men's basketball team represented North Carolina State University during the 1984–85 men's college basketball season. It was Jim Valvano's 5th season as head coach.

Two years after cutting down the nets in Albuquerque as NCAA champions, the Wolfpack returned to "The Pit" for first and second round action as No. 3 seed in the West region. NC State reached the Elite Eight before falling to St. John's, 75–67.

Roster

Schedule

|-
!colspan=12 style=| ACC Tournament

|-
!colspan=12 style=| NCAA Tournament

Rankings

References

NC State Wolfpack men's basketball seasons
Nc State
Nc State
NC State Wolfpack men's basketball
NC State Wolfpack men's basketball